The Desert Demon is a 1925 American silent Western film directed by Richard Thorpe and starring Jay Wilsey, Betty Morrissey and Harry Todd.

Cast
 Jay Wilsey as Bill Davis 
 Betty Morrissey as Nita Randall
 Frank Ellis as Jim Slade
 Harry Todd as Snitz Doolittle
 John M. O'Brien as Bugs
 Frank Austin as Dad Randall
 Margarita Martín as Squaw

References

Bibliography
 Connelly, Robert B. The Silents: Silent Feature Films, 1910-36, Volume 40, Issue 2. December Press, 1998.
 Munden, Kenneth White. The American Film Institute Catalog of Motion Pictures Produced in the United States, Part 1. University of California Press, 1997.

External links
 

1925 films
1925 Western (genre) films
1920s English-language films
American silent feature films
Silent American Western (genre) films
American black-and-white films
Films directed by Richard Thorpe
1920s American films